Boura may refer to:
Boura (Achaea) ancient Greek city
Boura, Burkina Faso (disambiguation)
Boura, Mali
Boura, a village in Forăști Commune, Suceava County, Romania

See also
Bouras, a surname